is a Japanese professional golfer on the LPGA of Japan Tour.

Kitada has won six times on the LPGA of Japan Tour between 2004 and 2010.

In February 2005, she teamed with Ai Miyazato to win the inaugural Women's World Cup of Golf in South Africa.

Professional wins

LPGA of Japan Tour wins (6)

Other wins (1)
2005 Women's World Cup of Golf (with Ai Miyazato)

Team appearances
Professional
World Cup (representing Japan): 2005 (winners)

References

External links

Japanese female golfers
LPGA of Japan Tour golfers
Sportspeople from Fukuoka (city)
1981 births
Living people